Five Star Island is an island of Bermuda.

Geography
Five Star Island, also known as Wilson Island is situated in the Little Sound on the North Coast of Bermuda in the Parish of Southampton.

Owners
Until 2012, Five Star Island was owned by one of Bermuda's wealthiest residents, Curt Engelhorn who, according to Forbes had a net worth as of March 2012 of $6.6 billion. Originally from Germany, Engelhorn is a resident of Gstaad, Switzerland who owned a major share holding in the Bermuda-registered German pharmaceutical multinational company, Corange Ltd.  Corange Ltd., in turn, owned Boehringer Mannheim and DePuy Inc. Engelhorn netted $5 billion when he sold his 40% share of Corange to Swiss pharmaceutical giant Roche in 1997 for US$11 billion. During his time in Bermuda, he made large donations to the Bermuda College and the Bermuda Biological Station.

References

Islands of Bermuda
Southampton Parish, Bermuda